Sweden Valley is a census-designated place located in Sweden Township in central Potter County in the state of Pennsylvania, United States.  It is located along the famous U.S. Route 6, a few miles east of Coudersport.  As of the 2010 census the population was 223 residents.

References

Census-designated places in Potter County, Pennsylvania
Census-designated places in Pennsylvania